The Illinois Department of Employment Security (IDES) is the code department of the Illinois state government that administers state unemployment benefits, runs the employment service and Illinois Job Bank, and publishes labor market information. , Jeffrey D. Mays was the Director of Employment Security.

Structure 
The board of review consists of 5 members, 2 of whom are representative citizens chosen from the employee class, 2 of whom are representative citizens chosen from the employing class, and one of whom is a representative citizen not identified with either the employing or employee classes.

The Employment Security Advisory Board is composed of 12 persons, 4 of whom are representative citizens chosen from the employee class, 4 of whom are representative citizens chosen from the employing class, and 4 of whom are representative citizens not identified with either the employing class or the employee class.

See also 
 Illinois Department of Labor

References

External links 
 Official website
 TITLE 56: LABOR AND EMPLOYMENT of the Illinois Administrative Code

Employment Security